Cardale may refer to:

 Cardale (surname), a surname
 Cardale, Manitoba, a village in Canada
 Cardale Babington (1808–1895), English botanist
 Cardale Jones (born 1992), American football quarterback

See also

 Cardal (disambiguation)
 Caudale